Spalding is an unincorporated community in the northwest United States, located in northern Nez Perce County, Idaho.

Description
U.S. Route 95 runs through the community and has a junction with U.S. Route 12 just west of town. Spalding is part of the Lewiston, ID-WA Metropolitan Statistical Area. The village was named after Reverend Henry Spalding, a missionary who taught the neighboring Nez Percé irrigation.

The headquarters and visitor's center for the Nez Perce National Historical Park are located at Spalding.

This place is notable as the birthplace of Lillian Disney, the wife of Walt Disney.

In the 1966 film El Dorado, John Wayne rode a six-year-old Appaloosa stallion named Zip, from Spalding.

References

External links

 Nez Percé National Park
 Nez Percé tribal site

Unincorporated communities in Idaho
Unincorporated communities in Nez Perce County, Idaho
Lewiston–Clarkston metropolitan area